Ʒ may refer to:

 Ezh (Ʒ, ʒ), a letter
 Dram (unit), a unit of mass
 Voiced palato-alveolar fricative
 3 (number)

See also 

 3 (disambiguation)
 Z (disambiguation) (Latin Z/z)
 Zeta (disambiguation) (Greek ζ/)
 Ǯ (Ezh with caron)
 Ze (Cyrillic) (З/з)
 Abkhazian Dze (Cyrillic Ӡ/ӡ)
 Yogh (Ȝ)
 Ƹ/ƹ (former IPA for ʕ; Latin ع (ayn), reversed ezh)
 EZH (disambiguation)